Sattoke is a town in the Punjab province of Pakistan. It is located at 31°14'26N 74°19'59E with an altitude of 195 metres (643 feet).

References

Villages in Punjab, Pakistan